Commander of the Ship is a 1954 Soviet drama film directed by Vladimir Braun.

Plot
The new graduate of the Naval Academy, captain of the third rank Vysotin becomes captain of the destroyer "Sovereign", obtaining it from his teacher captain Zolotov, who gets transferred to the headquarters. The command sets the task to bring the "Sovereign" into the number of advanced ships as soon as possible. Vysotin also bitterly learns that his beloved woman Tatiana has married Svetov, Captain of the Guard destroyer "Bold".

Vysotin starts to work. He decides to focus on improving the combat capability of the ship and the involvement of the whole team. Political officer Paramonov helps him overcome the difficulties by resorting to unexpected measures. For instance, he orders to steer the ship through a little-known Southern Strait, and the ship's doctor to command the landing. Svetov laughs at his actions and believes that the most important thing is iron submission to the commander.

Teachings commence. Suddenly, the mediator (Zolotov) orders the commanders and senior officers to withdraw from the command ("Killed") and navigators to lead ships through the South Channel. "Sovereign" brilliantly overcomes trials and on the "Bold", Svetov has to take control. Also during exercise the incorrigible sailor Stebelev, transferred from the "Bold" to Vysotin's team, makes a feat by eliminating on track a machine malfunction. Svetov recognizes Vysotin's victory.

The commander appoints Zolotov to his new cruiser. Zolotov takes a part of Vysotin's team. But he does not lose heart and is ready to further work with arrived replenishment.

Cast 
 Mikhail Kuznetsov - Captain Andrei Vysotin
 Anatoly Verbitsky - Captain Igor Svetov 
 Ludmila Sokolova - Tatiana Svetova
 Boris Smirnov - Captain Zolotov
 Nina Krachkovskaya - Natasha Zolotova
 Viktor Dobrovolsky - Admiral Serov
 Vladimir Balashov as Paramonov
 Vsevolod Tyagushev as Kiparisov (as Vladimir Tyagushev)
 Igor Gorbachyov as Plaksin
 Isai Gurov as Rossinsky

References

External links 

1954 films
1954 drama films
Soviet drama films
Dovzhenko Film Studios films
1950s Russian-language films